David Eugene Zweifel (born September 13, 1934) was United States Ambassador to North Yemen from 1981 to 1984. Zweifel entered the US Foreign Service in 1962, undertaking an assignment as a political officer in Brazil.

Biography
Zweifel graduated from Oregon State University (B.S., 1957; education major, planning on a teaching career). He served in the U.S. Navy as lieutenant in 1957-62 and as a Naval ROTC instructor at Princeton University in 1960–62.

List of foreign assignments
Consul, Rio de Janeiro (1993-1995)
Ambassador to North Yemen (1981–84)
Deputy Chief of Mission, Amman, Jordan (1979–81)
Deputy Chief of Mission, Muscat, Oman (1974–76)
Political Officer, Mexico City, Mexico (1971–74)
Consul, Amman, Jordan (1969–70)
Personnel Officer (1965–67)
Political Officer, Rio de Janeiro, Brazil (1962)

References

1934 births
Living people
Ambassadors of the United States to North Yemen
Oregon State University alumni
American consuls